Debt of Bones is a short novel by Terry Goodkind. It was first published in the August 1998 anthology Legends then later published as a stand-alone book in hardcover in 2001 and in paperback in 2004.

Plot summary

During the war against D'Hara, a young woman meets with Zeddicus Zu'l Zorander, Wizard of the First Order, so that she can force him to pay a debt of bones he owes her and save her child.  In so doing, she initiates the series of events leading up to the end of the war with D'Hara and the division of the Westlands, Midlands, and D'Hara by the boundaries.

Characters in "Debt of Bones"

Zeddicus Zu'l Zorander
Panis Rahl
Abby
Philip
Jana
Mariska
Delora
Anargo

External links

Official Terry Goodkind website

2001 American novels
American fantasy novels
American novellas
The Sword of Truth books